Katja Alli Maarit Taimela (born 23 November 1974 in Vampula) is a Finnish politician currently serving in the Parliament of Finland for the Social Democratic Party of Finland at the Finland Proper constituency.

References

1974 births
Living people
People from Huittinen
Social Democratic Party of Finland politicians
Members of the Parliament of Finland (2007–11)
Members of the Parliament of Finland (2011–15)
Members of the Parliament of Finland (2015–19)
Members of the Parliament of Finland (2019–23)
21st-century Finnish women politicians
Women members of the Parliament of Finland